Sno-Cross Championship Racing is an extreme sports video game. It was developed by Unique Development Studios and published by Crave Entertainment.

Gameplay
Sno-Cross Championship Racing is a snowmobile video game. It has seven locations to race on such as the Nagano Olympics, Aspen, and a naval ship graveyard in Murmansk. It also features a level editor that allows players to create their own race tracks.

Development
The game was developed by Unique Development Studios, having previously made No Fear Downhill Mountain Biking. The snowmobiles used in the game were licensed from Yamaha and modeled using Computer-aided design data that were also used in the machines' design.

Reception

Sno-Cross Championship Racing received "mixed or average reviews" on both platforms according to the review aggregation website Metacritic. Daniel Ericsson of Daily Radar praised the PlayStation version's track editor. Chris Charla of NextGen said of the Dreamcast version: "It's the only game of its kind on Dreamcast, and though it's not perfect, it's still a fair amount of fun."

Notes

References

External links
 

2000 video games
Crave Entertainment games
Dreamcast games
PlayStation (console) games
Unique Development Studios games
Video games developed in Sweden
Winter sports video games